Nasaussap Saqqaa (old spelling: Nasaussap Sarqâ) is a fjord in Avannaata municipality in northwestern Greenland.

Geography 
The Ussing Glacier or Ussing Bræer Glacier drains the Greenland ice sheet into the head of the fjord. The shores of Nasaussap Saqqaa are uninhabited; the closest settlement is Nuussuaq on a peninsula of the same name,  to the northwest of the fjord mouth.

References

External links
1:1,000,000 scale Operational Navigation Chart, Sheet B-8

Sugar Loaf Bay
Fjords of the Upernavik Archipelago